Emma Russack is an Australian singer and songwriter, who grew up in Narooma, New South Wales, where she graduated from high school in 2005. She currently lives in Melbourne.

In 2004, when she was 16, she won the contest Fresh Air of the Australian Broadcasting Corporation for young talents with her song "Used To This". By 2008, she was already known on YouTube, where she had posted eight covers, as well as two songs of her own, playing the guitar. For some time between 2007 and 2008, she took on the artistic name Lola Flash, while being the singer of a band of the same name. The group members were Jake Phillips (bass), Alec Marshall (guitar), Paul Mc Lean (drums) and Kate Delahunty (violin). The single "Psycho", published in 2009, is from that period. She spent a year travelling around in South America. In 2010, the EP Peasants was published, and in 2012 her first album, Sounds Of Our City, including ten songs, was released. Articles about her have appeared in the German and Australian editions of Rolling Stone and in the Australian magazine Frankie. She had her song "All My Dreaming" featured in the ending of The Walking Dead'''s Season 9 11th episode, "Bounty".

Discography
Solo
 Peasants (EP) (2010)
 Sounds Of Our City  (2012)
 You Changed Me (2014)
 In A New State (2016)
 Permanent Vacation (2017)
 Winter Blues (2019)

Emma Russack & Lachlan Denton
 When It Ends (2018)
 Keep On Trying (2018)
 Take The Reigns (2019)

Awards and nominations
EG Awards / Music Victoria Awards
The EG Awards (known as Music Victoria Awards'' since 2013) are an annual awards night celebrating Victorian music. They commenced in 2006.

|-
| EG Awards of 2012
| Emma Russack
| Best Female
| 
|-

References

External links 
 Emma Russack's web page

Australian women singers
Year of birth missing (living people)
Living people